An earthquake struck Peru at 04:18:45 PET (09:18:45 UTC) on 14 January 2018. It had a magnitude of  7.1  with a maximum perceived intensity of VII (very strong) on the Mercalli intensity scale. Two deaths have been reported, with a further 139 people injured. Widespread damage to adobe houses was reported with 443 homes being destroyed. An initial tsunami warning was later rescinded.

Background 
Earthquakes are common in Peru, especially in the Arequipa coastal area of Peru. This particular earthquake was a result of thrust faulting on the destructive boundary between the Nazca Plate and the South American Plate. As evidenced by the 2007 earthquake, many homes are not built to any type of standard making them prone to significant damage. Earthquakes can threaten industry as well as the population. Many of the copper mines are vulnerable to quakes, but there were no reports of damage to them.

Earthquake 
On Sunday, 14 January at 04:18 local time, a magnitude 7.1 earthquake struck Peru. There was no danger of a tsunami to the coastal area. Residents of Lomas, a town on the cost, were evacuated after feeling an aftershock.

The earthquake left two dead, and over a hundred and twenty injured. The earthquake caused some homes and roads in remote areas to collapse. Damage to roads delayed the arrival of help to the affected rural zones. Several boroughs were without electricity.

A tsunami was observed with heights of 15 cm in San Juan.

Aftermath 

A 55-year-old man was fatally crushed by a rock in the city of Yauca located in the region of Arequipa. No information was released on the second victim except that they were in the same region as the first victim.

See also 
2007 Peru Earthquake

References

External links

2018 earthquakes
2018 in Peru
Earthquakes in Peru
January 2018 events in South America
2018 disasters in Peru